Trinity Episcopal Cathedral is an historic church building at 310 West 17th Street in Little Rock, Arkansas, United States.  It is the seat of the Diocese of Arkansas and is listed on the National Register of Historic Places.

History
The fundraising for constructing the cathedral was done entirely by the Rt. Rev. Henry Niles Pierce, who was the fourth missionary bishop and the first diocesan bishop of Arkansas.  He went on preaching tours on the East Coast of the United States, procured private gifts, and mortgaged his own house.  The church itself was built in three stages as finances allowed. 

The nave and the baptistery were completed first and the first service was held in the cathedral on October 19, 1884.  On that same date the cathedral was formally established.  The transept and crossing were completed in February 1889, and the altar was moved from its original position under the west window to its new position under the north transept window.  The structure was finally completed when the chancel was built in time for Easter in 1892.  The altar was moved permanently to the east side of the church at that time.  The present altar and reredos were carved in Oberammegau and were donated in memory of Frances Blakeslee and Philander Keep Roots in 1924.  

The Parish House was built in 1951, and the Cathedral House was completed two years later.  The Lyman Annex was added to the cathedral complex in 1966 and the Chancellors Hall in 1981.  The cathedral itself was listed on the National Register of Historic Places in 1976. In 1987, an order for eight bells for the bell tower was placed with the Whitechapel Bell Foundry of London. They were installed the following year and are rung in the traditional English style of change ringing.

In 1998, when the Very Rev. Henry Lee Hudson was Dean, close to $5 million was spent in renovating the Cathedral proper.  The Dean's Hall was erected at this time.  The Muller Pipe Organ Co. of Toledo, Ohio installed a 4-manual, 82-rank pipe organ the following year.

See also
List of the Episcopal cathedrals of the United States
List of cathedrals in the United States
National Register of Historic Places listings in Little Rock, Arkansas

References

External links
Trinity Episcopal Cathedral web site

Religious organizations established in 1884
Churches completed in 1892
Episcopal cathedrals in the United States
Episcopal church buildings in Arkansas
Churches on the National Register of Historic Places in Arkansas
Gothic Revival church buildings in Arkansas
Churches in Little Rock, Arkansas
19th-century Episcopal church buildings
National Register of Historic Places in Little Rock, Arkansas
Historic district contributing properties in Arkansas
Cathedrals in Arkansas